Hurricane Darby was the first Eastern Pacific major hurricane since Hurricane Kenna in 2002. The sixth tropical cyclone, fourth named storm, and second hurricane of the 2004 Pacific hurricane season, Darby developed from a tropical wave that emerged from the west coast of Africa on July 12. After crossing into the Eastern Pacific, the storm became a tropical depression on June 26. The system steadily intensified, and became a hurricane on 000 UTC July 28. Darby peaked as a Category 3 hurricane on the Saffir-Simpson Hurricane Scale, though it quickly deteriorated due to cooler waters and increasing wind shear. While Darby dissipated on August 1, the remnants of the tropical cyclone affected the Hawaiian Islands. The system produced high waves and heavy rainfall that led to extensive flash flooding. Numerous roads were closed, while minor landslides and rockslides were reported. Despite the effects, no fatalities or severe damages occurred.

Meteorological history

A tropical wave emerged from the west coast of Africa on July 12 and entered the Atlantic Ocean. The wave progressed westward, crossing the Atlantic and Caribbean Sea before crossing into the Eastern Pacific on July 20. The west began to exhibit signs of development on July 23. The next day, the National Hurricane Center (NHC) noted an associated area of showers and thunderstorms, indicating that gradual development was possible. The system had become better organized and on July 25, the NHC continued to remark upon the potential for the weak low pressure area—accompanied by disorganized convective activity—to develop. Under the steering currents of a subtropical ridge of high pressure, the depression continued moving westward.

Upon becoming a tropical cyclone, the depression contained a somewhat well-defined low-level center of circulation, as well as convective banding. Based on Dvorak classifications, the storm was upgraded to a tropical storm at 0000 UTC on July 27; as the fourth tropical storm of the 2004 season, it was named Darby by the NHC. Darby continued to intensify, with established outflow and a well-defined banding feature. Later that day, forecasters predicted the storm to peak as a Category 1 hurricane on the Saffir-Simpson Hurricane Scale. Darby was upgraded to a hurricane at 0000 UTC on July 28, at which time it began to turn towards the northwest. An eye, embedded within the deep convection, developed later in the day. Darby attained Category 2 intensity at around 1800 UTC, and it rapidly strengthened to Category 3, becoming the first Eastern Pacific major hurricane since Hurricane Kenna of the 2002 season.

Shortly after peaking in intensity, Darby moved over coolers waters and began to deteriorate. The eye became less well-defined and the associated convection started weakening. Increasingly colder waters and growing wind shear continued to affect Darby, and the cyclone weakened to a tropical storm on July 30. The low-level center of circulation became exposed from the thunderstorm activity, and the storm quickly degenerated into a swirl of clouds, although it maintained tropical storm strength. On July 31, it weakened to a tropical depression. Darby soon crossed into the Central Pacific Hurricane Center's area of responsibility, and it dissipated as a tropical cyclone on August 1. However, its remnants continued westward under the low-level trade winds, and dropped heavy rainfall on Hawaii several days after the cyclone dissipated.

Impact

Upon reaching the Hawaiian Islands, the remnants of Darby contributed to heavy rainfall and high winds, prompting the issuance of flash flood watch. Along the eastern shores of Kauai, Oahu, Molokai, Maui, and the Island of Hawaii, the system generated  swells. The rainfall was beneficial in some areas, where dry conditions had persisted. Although crop damage from the storm system was limited, some farming operations were postponed and some coffee and nut trees were damaged.

The heavy rainfall resulted in flash flooding throughout several areas. On Oahu, roads and some structures were flooded, and minor landslides were reported. On the island, telephone and electrical service were disrupted. At one location, a large boulder rolled down a hillside and struck a fire hydrant; firefighters were called to shut it off. On Kauai, the Wailua River exceeded flood stage on August 4. Small stream and drainage ditch flooding was reported in the Kau District of Hawaii. Excessive runoff around Kailua-Kona resulted in extensive flooding that forced the closure of five schools, submerged several roads, and triggered rockslides. Due to high water, several roads, including part of the Piilani Highway on Maui, were temporarily shut down. Despite the flooding, neither Darby nor its remnant moisture caused any casualties or severe property damage.

See also

 List of Hawaii hurricanes
 Other tropical cyclones named Darby
 Timeline of the 2004 Pacific hurricane season
 Hurricane Blas (2022)

References

2004 Pacific hurricane season
Category 3 Pacific hurricanes
Hurricanes in Hawaii
2004 in Hawaii
Darby